Hydnobolites is a genus of fungi within the Pezizaceae family.

References

External links
Index Fungorum

Pezizaceae
Pezizales genera
Taxa named by Edmond Tulasne